Toddlers & Tiaras or Another Toddlers & Tiaras is an American reality television series that aired on TLC from January 27, 2009, to October 16, 2013. After a three-year hiatus due to much controversy, Another Toddlers and Tiaras aired the sequel on August 24, 2016. The show follows the personal lives of families of contestants in a child beauty pageant. Like many shows about children pageants, it generated controversy for dressing the children provocatively. The show led to other reality show spin-offs: Eden's World, Here Comes Honey Boo Boo, and Cheer Perfection. On November 24, 2016, TLC cancelled the show after its 7th season.

Episodes

Reception
The show has generated some negative reactions over the costumes of some of its participants. In an August 2012 custody hearing surrounding a child on the show, a court-appointed psychologist said, "Children adorned with pageantry identities are not 'playing' or 'pretending.' Instead, they are trained to closely resemble their adult counterparts." One mother on the show was criticized for padding her daughter's chest to resemble Dolly Parton's and another was criticized for asking her daughter to smoke fake cigarettes on stage.

Spin-offs
A spin-off series, Eden's World, began in March 2012 and focused on Eden Wood, her family, and her manager. In the show, Eden Wood helped other girls to compete in pageants. The show ended a few months later.

Here Comes Honey Boo Boo, a second spin-off, starring Alana "Honey Boo Boo" Thompson and her family began on August 8, 2012. The series was a reality show depicting contestant Honey Boo Boo, her parents, and her older sisters going about their lives outside of pageants. The show ended in 2014, after Thompson's mother was found to be in a relationship with a convicted sex offender.

Another spin-off, Cheer Perfection, began on December 21, 2012. The series features several of the children and their families from episodes of Toddlers & Tiaras. This reality series focuses on their cheer club Cheer Time Revolution and the drama with the mothers around the gym.

Yet another spin-off, Little Miss Atlanta, aired in 2016. This series followed contestants in the Little Miss Black US Pageant.

See also
 Child beauty pageant
 Beauty pageant

References

External links
 
 

2000s American reality television series
2010s American reality television series
2009 American television series debuts
2016 American television series endings
English-language television shows
Television series by Authentic Entertainment
Beauty pageants in the United States
TLC (TV network) original programming
Television series about children
Television shows set in the United States
Television series about beauty pageants
Child beauty pageants
Beauty pageants for youth
Television controversies in the United States
Obscenity controversies in television